Pyawbwe may refer to many places in Burma:

Pyawbwe Township
Pyawbwe, Pyawbwe Township
Pyawbwe, Myittha Township